The Tennessee Wesleyan Bulldogs are the athletic teams that represent Tennessee Wesleyan University, located in Athens, Tennessee, in intercollegiate sports as a member of the National Association of Intercollegiate Athletics (NAIA), primarily competing in the Appalachian Athletic Conference (AAC) since the 2001–02 academic year.

Varsity teams
Tennessee Wesleyan competes in 22 intercollegiate varsity sports: Men's sports include baseball, basketball, bowling, cross country, golf, lacrosse, soccer, tennis, track & field and volleyball; while women's sports include basketball, bowling, cross country, golf, lacrosse, soccer, softball, tennis, track & field and volleyball; and co-ed sports include cheerleading and eSports.

Baseball
They have a proud history in baseball, having won the NAIA World Series 2 times (2012, 2019) as well as 24 conference championships and 12 conference tournament championships.

Notable people
 Tom Browning, baseball player
 Ron Campbell, baseball player
 Chris Cattaneo, soccer player

National championships

Team

References

External links